Nexuotapirus is an extinct genus of tapir from the Late Oligocene and Early Miocene of North America.

Taxonomy
Nexuotapirus was erected in 1998. The type species, N. marslandensis, was originally classified under Miotapirus. The second species, N. robustus, was originally placed in Protapirus but was also moved to Nexuotapirus based on comparable lower dentition.

Description
Nexuotapirus shows both plesiomorphic and derived features compared to other early tapirs, making its exact relationship with them difficult to place.

Primitive traits of the genus include less molar-like premolars  and  incisive  foramina  that  extend  posteriorly through  the  postcanine  diastema, as well as a braincase that tapers towards the back. More advanced features include deep  retraction  of  the  nasal  incision,  nasal shortening, frontal shortening,  and reduction of the supraorbital process, features comparable to the modern Tapirus.

References

Prehistoric tapirs
Oligocene odd-toed ungulates
Oligocene mammals of North America
Miocene odd-toed ungulates
Miocene mammals of North America